Ichthyothereol is a toxic polyyne compound found in the leaves and flowers of several plants in South and Central America. These plant sources and their extracts are known for their toxic effects on fish, and have long been used by various native tribes in the lower Amazon basin for fishing. The name of the genus Ichthyothere, the members of which contain noticeable amounts of the natural product in their leaves, literally translates as fish poison. It is so toxic, fish will jump out of the water if Ichthyothere terminalis leaves are used as bait. This chemical is also found in the leaves and flowers of Dahlia coccinea. The actual chemical was isolated by several different groups and its full chemical structure determined in 1965. The first total synthesis was published in 2001.

It is also toxic to mice and dogs, producing convulsant effects that are similar to those of picrotoxin.

References 

Convulsants
Plant toxins
Tetrahydropyrans
Polyynes
Conjugated enynes
Secondary alcohols